The B8 is a main road of Cyprus. It connects the city of Limassol and the Troödos mountainous region. Although it's a very well maintained road, many accidents have occurred on it especially on a big bend near the village of Moniatis locally referred as the "turn of death". Because of the long traffic congestion occurring during rush hours right outside the Limassol urban area, plans are underway for a new 4-lane Motorway linking a recently reconstructed section of the road next to Spyros Kyprianou Athletic Center to the village of Saittas, roughly 15 km south of Troödos Sq. Construction should start by 2014.

See also 
 B6 road (Cyprus)
 B20 road (Cyprus)

References 

Motorways and roads in Cyprus